Vidar the Vampire (also known as VampyrVidar) is a 2017 Norwegian comedy horror film directed by Thomas Aske Berg and Fredrik Waldeland, starring Thomas Aske Berg,  Skrettingland and Kim Sønderholm.

Cast
 Thomas Aske Berg as Vidar Hårr
 Ruben Jonassen as Young Vidar Hårr
  Skrettingland as Jesus
 Kim Sønderholm as Psychologist
 Marit Sander as Kristin Hårr
 Martha Kristine Kåstad as Karin
 Henrik Rafaelsen as Pastor Tor Magne Abrahamsen
 Linda Tveiten as Drunk Cunt
 Ingvar Skretting as Pastor Arne Friestad
 Kathrine Junger Ims as Reporter

Release
The film premiered at the Norwegian International Film Festival on 23 August 2017.

Reception
Ian Sedensky of Culture Crypt gave the film a score of 70 out of 100. Nick Spacek of Starburst rated the film 6 stars out of 10, writing that the film "successfully combines all of the aspects of what came before, while definitely leaning into being a gorier, raunchier dark comedy. However, that raunchy aspect can really take the fun out of Vidar the Vampire." Christopher O'Keefe of ScreenAnarchy wrote a positive review of the film, writing that "While the sometimes shockingly perverse situational comedy doesn’t always sit well with the deeper themes the film explores, the steady flow of gasp inducing moments make it a consistently entertaining watch." Michael Gingold of Rue Morgue wrote a mixed review of the film, writing that the film "isn’t for every taste, and if some of its transgressions are more clever than others, it ultimately amuses more than it offends." Film critic Kim Newman wrote a mixed review of the film.

References

External links
 
 

2017 comedy horror films
Norwegian comedy horror films